Devotion is a 1921 American silent drama film directed by Burton George and starring Hazel Dawn, Elmo Lincoln and Violet Palmer.

Cast
 Hazel Dawn as Ruth Wayne 
 Elmo Lincoln as Robert Trent 
 Violet Palmer as Marian Wayne 
 Renita Randolph as Lucy Marsh 
 Bradley Barker as Stephen Bond 
 Henry G. Sell as James Marsh 
 Wedgwood Nowell as Teddy Grandin

References

Bibliography
 Munden, Kenneth White. The American Film Institute Catalog of Motion Pictures Produced in the United States, Part 1. University of California Press, 1997.

External links
 

1921 films
1921 drama films
1920s English-language films
American silent feature films
Silent American drama films
American black-and-white films
Films directed by Burton George
1920s American films